Tres de la Cruz Roja is a 1961 Spanish comedy film directed by Fernando Palacios and written by Vicente Coello and Pedro Masó

Plot 
Jacinto, Pepe and Manolo are three friends and Real Madrid supporters who are upset with the high price of tickets to Santiago Bernabeu Stadium. They pursue an offer from the Spanish Red Cross to get free access to the football matches. But once in there, they abandon their selfishness and work for the cause.

Cast 
 José Luis López Vázquez as Jacinto
 Tony Leblanc as Pepe
 Manolo Gómez Bur as Manolo
 Ethel Rojo as Laura
 Licia Calderón as Luchi
 Francisco Camoiras as Felipe
 Jesús Puente as Ct. Martín

External links 

1960s buddy comedy films
Spanish association football films
1961 films
1960s sports comedy films
Films set in Madrid
Real Madrid CF
1961 comedy films
Spanish sports comedy films
1960s Spanish films